Andrew David Waters  nicknamed 'B.A.' (born December 30, 1998) is an American professional baseball outfielder for the Kansas City Royals of Major League Baseball (MLB).

Amateur career
Waters graduated from Etowah High School in Woodstock, Georgia. As a senior, he batted .516 with 15 home runs and 40 RBIs, leading Etowah to a Class 7A state championship title. After the season, he was named the Georgia Gatorade Player of the Year and the Metro Atlanta High School Player of the Year. He committed to play college baseball at the University of Georgia for the Georgia Bulldogs.

Professional career

Atlanta Braves organization
The Atlanta Braves selected Waters in the second round, with the 41st overall selection, of the 2017 Major League Baseball draft. He signed with the Braves for a $1.5 million signing bonus, forgoing his commitment to Georgia.

After signing, Waters made his professional debut with the Rookie-level Gulf Coast League Braves. After batting .347/.448/.571 with two home runs, ten RBIs, and seven walks, he was promoted to the Danville Braves of the Rookie Advanced Appalachian League, where he finished the season. In 36 games for Danville, he slashed .255/.331/.383 with two home runs and 14 RBIs. In 2018, he began with the Rome Braves of the Class A South Atlantic League, with whom he earned All-Star honors, and was promoted to the Florida Fire Frogs of the Class A-Advanced Florida State League on August 1. In 114 games between the two clubs, he slashed .293/.343/.476 with nine home runs, 39 RBIs, and 23 stolen bases. In 2019, he began with the Mississippi Braves of the Class AA Southern League and was named an All-Star. In August, he was promoted to the Gwinnett Stripers of the Class AAA International League. Over 134 games with the two teams, Waters batted .309/.360/.459 with seven home runs, 52 RBIs, and 16 stolen bases. He was named the Southern League Most Valuable Player. After the season, he was selected for the United States national baseball team in the 2019 WBSC Premier 12.

Waters did not play a minor league game in 2020 due to the cancellation of the minor league season caused by the COVID-19 pandemic. He was added to Atlanta's 60-man player pool and trained with other players in the pool in Gwinnett County, Georgia over the course of the summer. For the 2021 season, he was assigned to Gwinnett, now members of the Triple-A East. In June, Waters was selected to play in the All-Star Futures Game at Coors Field. Over 103 games played for Gwinnett, Waters slashed .240/.329/.381 with 11 home runs, 37 RBIs, and 28 stolen bases.

On November 18, 2021, the Braves selected Waters' contract and added him to the 40-man roster. Waters began the 2022 season on the injured list for Gwinnett. He was activated in early May. Over 49 games with Gwinnett, he batted .246 with five home runs and 16 RBIs.

Kansas City Royals
On July 11, 2022, the Braves traded Waters, CJ Alexander, and Andrew Hoffmann to the Kansas City Royals in exchange for the 35th overall pick in the 2022 Major League Baseball draft. The Royals optioned Waters to the Omaha Storm Chasers. Over 31 games with Omaha, he hit .295 with seven home runs, 17 RBIs, and 13 stolen bases.

On August 22, 2022, the Royals promoted Waters to the major leagues.

References

External links

1998 births
Living people
Baseball players from Atlanta
Danville Braves players
Florida Fire Frogs players
Gulf Coast Braves players
Gwinnett Stripers players
Kansas City Royals players
Major League Baseball outfielders
Mississippi Braves players
Omaha Storm Chasers players
People from Woodstock, Georgia
Rome Braves players
United States national baseball team players
2019 WBSC Premier12 players